Puruṣārtha (Purushartha) may refer to:

 Puruṣārtha- Object of human pursuit
 Puruşārthasiddhyupāya- a major Jain text
 Purushartham